Karthik Rathnam is an Indian actor who works in Telugu theatre and Telugu cinema. Rathnam made his debut with the critical acclaimed film C/o Kancharapalem (2018),  which was the first Telugu film to be screened in New York Film Festival. Followed by his appearance in ZEE5's Gods of Dharmapuri (G.O.D), Rathnam reprised his role in Tamil remake of C/o Kancharapalem.

Early life 
Rathnam was born and brought up in Secunderabad, Telangana. While pursuing CA, he joined a theatre with Borusu Leni Bomma for which he has been awarded Nandi Award among many other, He then discontinued his education and went on to perform 30 plays in various cities.

Career 
After being an artist, dancer and actor at theatre, he was offered his first role C/o Kancharapalem's Joseph, which was one of the most critically acclaimed Telugu films of 2018. It was screened at the New York Film Festival. Rathnam later appeared as Ravi Reddy. with actor Satyadev Kancharana in ZEE5's Gods of Dharmapuri  . He reprised his role as Joseph in Tamil remake of C/o Kancharapalem, titled C/o Kaadhal.

Filmography

References

External links

Indian male film actors
Male actors in Telugu cinema
Male actors in Tamil cinema
1997 births
Living people
Male actors from Hyderabad, India
21st-century Indian male actors
Male actors in Telugu theatre